Arshwin G. Asjes (born 19 September 1985 in Willemstad, Curacao) is a Dutch baseball player who played for the Netherlands national baseball team at the 2009 Baseball World Cup, 2011 Baseball World Cup, and  2014 European Baseball Championship.

Career
A native of Willemstad, Curaçao, Asjes attended Cheverus High School in Portland, Maine, and was selected by the Cleveland Indians in the 34th round of the 2005 MLB Draft. A right-handed pitcher, Asjes opted to play college baseball at Gloucester County College and Temple University. In 2006, he was named Temple's outstanding pitcher, and was an all-Philadelphia Big 5 selection. After the 2006 season, he played collegiate summer baseball with the Harwich Mariners of the Cape Cod Baseball League, striking out 18 in 15 innings of work.

Asjes began his professional career with the Midwest Sliders of the Frontier League in 2009, and went on to play in the Dutch Major League from 2010 to 2015. His best season came in 2014, when he went 5–0 with nine saves and a 1.72 ERA.

References

External links

 www.honkbalsite.com baseball profile

Dutch people of Curaçao descent
Harwich Mariners players
People from Willemstad
Temple Owls baseball players
1985 births
Living people
Dutch expatriate baseball players in the United States
DOOR Neptunus players
Corendon Kinheim players
Konica Minolta Pioniers players